The Pisaniidae are a taxonomic family of medium-sized sea snails, marine gastropod mollusks in the superfamily Buccinoidea.

Genera
 Ameranna Landau & Vermeij, 2012
 Anna Risso, 1826
 Aplus De Gregorio, 1885
 Bailya M. Smith, 1944
 Cancellopollia Vermeij & Bouchet, 1998
 Cantharus Röding, 1798
 Crassicantharus Ponder, 1972
 Dianthiphos Watters, 2009
 † Editharus Vermeij 2001 
 Engina Gray, 1839
 Enginella Monterosato, 1917
 Gemophos Olsson & Harbison, 1953
 Hesperisternia J. Gardner, 1944
 Micrologus Fraussen & Rosado, 2011
 Monostiolum Dall, 1904
 Pisania Bivona-Bernardi, 1832
 Pollia Gray, 1834
 Pusio Gray, 1833
 Solenosteira Dall, 1890
 Steye Faber, 2004

References

External links

 Watters, G. T. (2009). A revision of the western Atlantic Ocean genera Anna, Antillophos, Bailya, Caducifer, Monostiolum, and Parviphos, with description of a new genus, Dianthiphos, and notes on Engina and Hesperisternia (Gastropoda: Buccinidae: Pisaniinae) and Cumia (Colubrariidae). The Nautilus. 123(4): 225-275

 
Gastropod families